Fred C. Newmeyer (August 9, 1888 – April 24, 1967) was an American actor, film director and film producer.

Biography
A native of Central City, Colorado, Newmeyer is best known for directing a handful of films in the Our Gang series and for directing several Harold Lloyd movies. With Sam Taylor, Newmeyer co-directed Lloyd in films including Safety Last! (1923), Girl Shy (1924), and The Freshman (1925). Newmeyer also had an extensive directing and acting resume in other comedy short films. He appeared as an actor in 71 films between 1914 and 1923.

Prior to his film career, Newmeyer played professional baseball. Partial statistics exist for his time as a left-handed pitcher in Minor League Baseball at the Class D level from 1911 to 1913 in the Southwest Texas League, Michigan State League, and Central Association. He made at least 66 appearances and was the winning pitcher of at least 26 games.

Newmeyer was the original director of the first short in the Our Gang series, also titled Our Gang; his version tested poorly, and producer Hal Roach scrapped most of the footage and remade the short with Robert McGowan as the director. Newmeyer, after directing numerous other shorts at Roach, returned to the Our Gang series in 1936 to direct The Pinch Singer, Arbor Day, Mail and Female and the feature film General Spanky.

Newmeyer and his wife, Berna, had a son, Fred W. After his film career, Newmeyer worked with the athletic department of University High School in Los Angeles. Newmeyer died on April 24, 1967, in Woodland Hills, California, at the age of 78.

Selected filmography

 Luke's Shattered Sleep (1916)
 Luke Locates the Loot (1916)
 Luke's Fireworks Fizzle (1916)
 Luke, Rank Impersonator (1916)
 Luke's Movie Muddle (1916)
 Luke's Newsie Knockout (1916)
 Luke, Patient Provider (1916)
 Luke, the Gladiator (1916)
 Luke's Preparedness Preparations (1916)
 Luke, the Chauffeur (1916)
 Luke and the Bang-Tails (1916)
 Luke's Speedy Club Life (1916)
 Luke and the Mermaids (1916)
 Luke Joins the Navy (1916)
 Luke Does the Midway (1916)
 Luke's Lost Lamb (1916)
 Luke, Crystal Gazer (1916)
 Luke Rides Roughshod (1916)
 Luke's Society Mixup (1916)
 Luke's Late Lunchers (1916)
 Luke, the Candy Cut-Up (1916)
 The Big Idea (1917)
 Step Lively (1917)
 Bashful (1917)
 Move On (1917)
 We Never Sleep (1917)
 All Aboard (1917)
 Clubs Are Trump (1917)
 Love, Laughs and Lather (1917)
 Rainbow Island (1917)
 From Laramie to London (1917)
 Birds of a Feather (1917)
 By the Sad Sea Waves (1917)
 Pinched (1917)
 Lonesome Luke Loses Patients (1917)
 Over the Fence (1917)
 Lonesome Luke's Wild Women (1917)
 Lonesome Luke, Messenger (1917)
 Lonesome Luke on Tin Can Alley (1917)
 Two-Gun Gussie (1918)
 It's a Wild Life (1918)
 Pipe the Whiskers (1918)
 The Tip (1918)
 From Hand to Mouth (1919)
 Captain Kidd's Kids (1919)
 Bumping Into Broadway (1919)
 His Only Father (1919)
 Pay Your Dues (1919)
 Count the Votes (1919)
 Soft Money (1919)
 He Leads, Others Follow (1919)
 The Rajah (1919)
 Be My Wife (1919)
 Don't Shove (1919)
 Heap Big Chief (1919)
 Chop Suey & Co. (1919)
 Count Your Change (1919)
 Spring Fever (1919)
 Off the Trolley (1919)
 Swat the Crook (1919)
 Pistols for Breakfast (1919)
 The Marathon (1919)
 Si, Senor (1919)
 Ring Up the Curtain (1919)
 Crack Your Heels (1919)
 Young Mr. Jazz (1919)
 A Sammy in Siberia (1919)
 On the Fire (1919)
 Number, Please? (1920)
 Doctor Jack (1922)
 Safety Last! (1923)
 Why Worry? (1923)
 Girl Shy (1924)
 The Perfect Clown (1925)
 The Freshman (1925)
 On Your Toes (1927)
 Warming Up (1928)
 It Can Be Done (1929)
 Queen High (1930)
 The Grand Parade (1930)
 Subway Express (1931)
 The Gambling Sex (1932)
 The Fighting Gentleman (1932)
 Easy Millions (1933)
 No Ransom (1934)
 Secrets of Chinatown (1935)
 The Pinch Singer (1936)
 Arbor Day (1936)
 Mail and Female (1937)

Notes

References

External links

1888 births
1967 deaths
People from Central City, Colorado
American male film actors
Hal Roach Studios filmmakers
20th-century American male actors
Film directors from Colorado
Baseball players from Colorado
Baseball pitchers
Corpus Christi Pelicans players
Bay City Rice Eaters players
Ludington Mariners players
Muscatine Wallopers players